Jeff Clayton (February 16, 1954 – December 16, 2020) was an American jazz alto saxophonist and flautist.

Clayton studied oboe at California State University before dropping out to undertake a tour with Stevie Wonder. Following this he recorded with Gladys Knight, Kenny Rogers, Michael Jackson, Patti LaBelle, and Madonna. With his brother John Clayton he founded The Clayton Brothers in 1977, and later formed the Clayton-Hamilton Jazz Orchestra with Jeff Hamilton.

He worked with Frank Sinatra, Sammy Davis Jr., Ella Fitzgerald, Woody Herman, Lionel Hampton, Ethan Smith, and Lena Horne, and played in the Count Basie Orchestra while under the leadership of Thad Jones. From 1989 to 1991 he was a member of the Philip Morris Superband. He also toured with Gene Harris, Dianne Reeves, Joe Cocker, B.B. King, and Ray Charles.

Clayton died on December 16, 2020, after suffering from kidney cancer. He was 66 years old.

Awards and recognition
In December 2009, Brother to Brother by The Clayton Brothers received a Grammy Award nomination in the Best Jazz Instrumental Album, Individual or Group category.

Discography
 Boogie-Down, Ernestine Anderson and the Clayton-Hamilton Jazz Orchestra, 1989
 Groove Shop, Clayton-Hamilton Jazz Orchestra, 1989
 Heart and Soul, Clayton-Hamilton Jazz Orchestra, 1991
 Music, The Clayton Brothers, 1991
 Absolutely, Clayton-Hamilton Jazz Orchestra, 1995
 Expressions, The Clayton Brothers, 1997
 Explosive!, Milt Jackson and the Clayton-Hamilton Jazz Orchestra, 1999
 Siblingity, The Clayton Brothers, 2000
 Back in the Swing of Things, The Clayton Brothers, 2005
 Christmas Songs, Diana Krall and the Clayton-Hamilton Jazz Orchestra, 2005
 Clayton-Hamilton Jazz Orchestra: Live at MCG, 2005
 Flirting With Twilight, Kurt Elling, 2001

References

Further reading
[ The Clayton Brothers] at AllMusic
Scott Yanow, [ Jeff Clayton] at AllMusic

External links
 
 

1954 births
2020 deaths
American jazz saxophonists
American male saxophonists
Big band bandleaders
Jazz musicians from California
21st-century American saxophonists
21st-century American male musicians
American male jazz musicians
Clayton-Hamilton Jazz Orchestra members
20th-century American saxophonists